Two-time defending champion Novak Djokovic defeated Andy Murray in the final, 6–2, 6–4 to win the singles tennis title at the 2015 Paris Masters. It was his record fourth Paris Masters title. With the win, Djokovic became the first man to win six Masters 1000 titles in the same year.

Seeds
All seeds receive a bye into the second round.

Draw

Finals

Top half

Section 1

Section 2

Bottom half

Section 3

Section 4

Qualifying

Seeds

Qualifiers

Lucky losers

Qualifying draw

First qualifier

Second qualifier

Third qualifier

Fourth qualifier

Fifth qualifier

Sixth qualifier

References
 Main Draw
 Qualifying Draw

Singles